Belton Richard (October 5, 1939 – June 21, 2017) was an American Cajun accordionist and vocalist known for his baritone vocal range.

Biography
Richard was born in Rayne, Louisiana in 1939.  He began to play the accordion at age seven, and at 12 he started playing with 'Neg Halloway and the Rayne Playboys. He founded The Musical Aces in 1959 after a stint playing rock and roll and swamp pop.  During his tenure, he released many popular songs, including "Un Autre Soir Ennuyant," "Pardon Waltz," and "Waltz of No Return." Another notable song is "Cajun Streak," an inspired translation of Ray Stevens' novelty hit. He died on June 21, 2017 at the age of 77 after being hospitalized with pneumonia.

Legacy
The 1995 Festivals Acadiens et Créoles was dedicated to Richard. Richard was inducted into the Cajun French Music Association's Hall of Fame in 1997, its inaugural year. In 2003, he was inducted into the Acadian museum's 'Living Legends' list. He also won the Cajun French Music Association's 'Male Vocalist of the Year' in 2004.

Discography
I'm back (1995)
The Older The Wine, The Finer The Taste (2003)

References

1939 births
2017 deaths
Cajun accordionists
People from Rayne, Louisiana
Musicians from Louisiana
Deaths from pneumonia in Louisiana